Joseph Allen Frear Jr. (March 7, 1903 – January 15, 1993) was an American businessman and politician. A Democrat, he served as a United States Senator from Delaware from 1949 to 1961. He was defeated for a third term by Republican politician J. Caleb Boggs in 1960.

Early life
J. Allen Frear was born on a farm near Rising Sun, in Kent County, Delaware, to Joseph Allen and Clara (née Lowber) Frear. His mother died in 1922, and his father subsequently married her brother's daughter. Frear was a distant relative of Robert Freer, who served as chairman of the Federal Trade Commission. One of three children, he received his early education at local public schools, and graduated from Caesar Rodney High School in 1920.

Frear studied at the University of Delaware in Newark, where he received a bachelor of science degree in agriculture in 1924. Following his graduation, he became operator of three farms and president of a retail business that distributed milk, fuel, farm machinery, and fertilizer. He served as commissioner of Delaware State College in Dover (1936–1941) and of the Delaware Old Age Welfare Commission (1938–1948). Also interested in banking, he was director (1938–1946) and chairman of the board (1946–1948) of the Federal Land Bank in Baltimore, Maryland. During World War II, he served as a major in the U.S. Army from 1944 to 1946. From 1947 to 1951, he was president of Kent General Hospital in Dover.

Political career
Frear was elected to the U.S. Senate in 1948, defeating incumbent Republican Senator C. Douglass Buck in a close race. During this term, he served in the Democratic majority in the 81st and 82nd Congresses, and the Democratic minority in the 83rd Congress. He was again elected to the U.S. Senate in 1954, defeating Republican Representative Herbert B. Warburton by a wider than expected margin. During this term, he again served with the Democratic majority in the 84th, 85th, and 86th Congresses. Frear did not sign the 1956 Southern Manifesto and voted in favor of the Civil Rights Act of 1960, while not voting on the Civil Rights Act of 1957.

Frear narrowly lost his bid for a third term in 1960 to Republican Governor J. Caleb Boggs. In all, he served in the Senate from January 3, 1949 to January 3, 1961. After he left the Senate, President John F. Kennedy appointed him to the Securities and Exchange Commission, where he served from 1961 until 1963. Later he resumed his career in business and banking.

Death and legacy
Frear died at Dover and is buried in the Odd Fellows Cemetery at Camden, Delaware. The J. Allen Frear Federal Building at 300 South New Street in Dover is named in his honor. There is also an Allen Frear Elementary School in Camden.

References

Images
Political and Historical Figures Portrait Gallery Portrait courtesy of Historical and Cultural Affairs, Dover.

External links
Biographical Directory of the United States Congress 
Delaware's Members of Congress 

The Political Graveyard 
Senator J. Allen Frear, Jr., papers from Special Collections, University of Delaware Libraries, Museums and Press
Audio, 1953-1959 - This Week in Congress (Sen. Frear's weekly radio address) from University of Delaware Institutional Repository

1903 births
1993 deaths
People from Dover, Delaware
United States Army personnel of World War II
University of Delaware alumni
Delaware State University people
Delaware Democrats
Democratic Party United States senators from Delaware
Members of the U.S. Securities and Exchange Commission
Burials in Kent County, Delaware
20th-century American politicians
Kennedy administration personnel
United States Army officers
Military personnel from Delaware